Dr. Sugiswara Abeywardena Wickramasinghe (13 April 1900 – 25 August 1981) was the founder of the Communist Party of Sri Lanka. He was the first Leftist to be elected to Ceylon State Council in 1931. He gave up all his wealth and comforts for the sake of downtrodden. He is considered one of the leading political figures in the twentieth century of Sri Lanka.

Early life and education
S. A. Wickramasinghe was born in Nasnaranketiya Walawwa, Athuraliya in the Matara district of then British Ceylon in 1900. He received his primary education at Mahinda College, Galle, where he joined engaged in social services and Buddhist activities. He later entered Ananda College, Colombo.

Wickramasinghe pursued his higher studies in medicine at the Ceylon Medical College, and proceeded to the United Kingdom for his post-graduate studies.

In England, he participated on activism with the League Against Imperialism and the British Communist Party. During this time he met fellow Ceylonese progressives and the future leaders of the Left movement such as N. M. Perera, Colvin R. de Silva and Leslie Goonewardene, who were also studying in London and fellow-students of Marxism.

Early activism
On his way back to Ceylon, S. A. Wickramasinghe travelled to India to meet members of the Indian National Congress as well as the Communist Party of India. He was immediately arrested by British police in Bombay but managed to make contact with figures such as Jawaharlal Nehru and Rabindranath Tagore.

After returning to Sri Lanka, he co-founded the Lanka Sama Samaja Party and also served as the General Manager of Buddhist Theosophical Society schools in Sri Lanka. A medical practitioner by profession, he started working as a doctor after his post-graduate studies and  joined the  Government Service and started practising in his native Matara district.

Wickramasinghe played a leading role in the Suriya Mal Movement. He also organised relief for peasants during the Malaria epidemic and floods that plagued Sri Lanka in 1934 and 1935.

Founding of Communist Party of Ceylon

In 1941, when Germany attacked the Soviet Union, Wickramasinghe led the faction who argued that World War 2 was not an inter-imperialist war but a war against fascism. For their defence of Stalin and the Soviet Union, Wickramasinghe and his comrades were expelled by the Trotskyites in the LSSP.

Wickramasinghe's faction, which included Pieter Keuneman, M. G. Mendis, and A. Vaidialingam formed the United Socialist Party, which became the Communist Party of Ceylon in 1943.

Personal life
Dr Wickramasinghe was married to Doreen Young, a British leftist who later became a prominent Communist politician and a Member of Parliament in Sri Lanka. She and Dr Wickremasinghe had two children, Suren (an architect) and Suriya (Amnesty International IEC Chairperson, 1982–85).

Publications
 The Gal Oya Project (1951)
 The Way Ahead

Electoral history

See also
Suriya-Mal Movement
Lanka Sama Samaja Party

References 

 dailynews.lk Biography of S. A. Wickramasinghe
 Dr. S. A. Wickramasinghe remembered on his 102nd birthday

1900 births
1981 deaths
Alumni of Mahinda College
Alumni of Ananda College
Alumni of Ceylon Medical College
Communist Party of Sri Lanka politicians
People from Matara, Sri Lanka
Members of the 1st State Council of Ceylon
Members of the 2nd State Council of Ceylon